ReAnimator Coffee is a Philadelphia-based coffee roaster and cafe chain. The company operates five cafes, in Fishtown, Kensington, South Philadelphia, West Philadelphia, and Port Richmond. and its roasting facilities are located in Kensington. The Kensington location opened in 2014. The owners also operate Philadelphia restaurant Res Ipsa and donut shop Hello Donuts, both of which serve ReAnimator Coffee. ReAnimator Coffee is a part of the third wave of coffee.

References

Companies based in Philadelphia
Coffeehouses and cafés in the United States
Coffee brands